The Seoul Metropolitan Subway is a metropolitan railway system consisting of 23 rapid transit, light metro, commuter rail and people mover lines located in northwest South Korea. The system serves most of the Seoul Metropolitan Area including the Incheon metropolis and satellite cities in Gyeonggi province.

The network consists of multiple systems that form a larger, coherent system. These being the Seoul Metro proper, consisting of Seoul Metro lines 1 through 9 and certain light rail lines, that serves Seoul city proper and its surroundings; Korail regional rail lines, which serve the greater metropolitan region and beyond; Incheon Metro lines, operated by Incheon Transit Corporation, that serve Incheon city proper; and miscellaneous light rail lines, such as Gimpo Goldline and Yongin Everline, that connect corners of their respective cities to the rest of the network. Most of the system is operated by three companies – Seoul Metro, Korail (Korea Railroad Corporation), and Incheon Metro - with the rest being operated by an assortment of local municipal corporations and private rail companies.

Its first metro line, Line 1, started construction in 1971 and began operations in 1974, with through-operation to Korail's suburban railways. As of 2022, the network has  of track on lines 1–9 alone.

Overview
The first line of the Seoul Subway network started construction in 1971. The first section of subway was built using the cheaper cut and cover construction method. Initial lines relied heavily on Japanese technology, and subsequent lines procured technological imports from Japan and the United Kingdom. For example, Line 1 opened in 1974 with through services joining surrounding Korail suburban railway lines influenced by the Tokyo subway. Today, many of the Seoul Metropolitan Subway's lines are operated by Korail, South Korea's national rail operator. 

It has been described as the world's longest multi-operator metro system by route length. The subway has free WiFi accessible in all stations and trains. Nearly all stations have platform screen doors installed; only some minor Korail-operated stations remain with open platforms. By 2017, Korail will completely install screen doors in every station and platform. The world's first virtual mart for smartphone users opened at Seolleung station in 2011.

All directional signs in the system are written in Korean using Hangul, as well as English and Katakana/Chinese characters for Japanese and Mandarin Chinese. In trains there are in addition many LCD screens giving service announcements, upcoming stop names, YTN news, stock prices and animated shorts. There are also prerecorded voice announcements that give the upcoming station, any possible line transfer, and the exiting side in Korean, followed by English. At major stations, this is followed by Japanese, then Mandarin Chinese, as well.

Seoul Subway uses full-color LCD screens at all stations to display real-time subway arrival times, which are also available on apps for smartphones. Most trains have digital TV screens, and all of them have air conditioning and climate controlled seats installed that are automatically heated in the winter. In 2014, it became the world's first metro operator to use transparent displays for ads when it installed 48 transparent displays on major stations of Line 2 in Gangnam District.
All lines use the T-money smart payment system using RFID and NFC technology for automatic payment by T-money smart cards, smartphones, or credit cards and one can transfer to any of the other line within the system for free.

Trains on numbered lines and light rail lines generally run on the right-hand track, while trains on the named heavy-rail lines (e.g. Shinbundang Line, Bundang Line, and AREX) run on the left-hand track. The exceptions are the trains on Line 1, as well as those on Line 4 south of Namtaeryeong station. These lines run on the left-hand track because these rail lines are government-owned or through-run to government own lines and follow a different standard to the metro, one that is followed by all national rail lines with the exception of the Ilsan Line.

History
Line 1, from Seongbuk station to Incheon station and Suwon station, opened on 15 August 1974. On 9 December 1978, the Yongsan-Cheongnyangni line via Wangsipni (now part of the Jungang Line) was added to Line 1. Line 2 opened on 10 October 1980. In 1985, the fare system changed from charging by distance to zone and the Edmondson railway ticket changed to a magnetic paper ticket. Line 4 opened on 20 April 1985, and
Line 3 on 12 July. On 1 April 1994, the Indeogwon-Namtaeryeong extension of Line 4 opened. The Bundang Line, from Suseo station to Ori station, opened on 1 September. On 15 November 1995, Line 5 opened. The Jichuk-Daehwa extension of Line 3 opened on 30 January 1996. On 20 March, the Kkachisan-Sindorim extension of Line 2 opened. Line 7 opened on 11 October, and Line 8 on 23 November. On 6 October 1999, Incheon Subway Line 1 opened.

Seoul Subway Line 6 opened on 7 August 2000. In 2004 the fare system reverted to charging by distance, and free bus transfers were introduced. The Byeongjeom-Cheonan extension of Line 1 opened on 20 January 2005. On 16 December, the Jungang Line from Yongsan station to Deokso station opened. The Uijeongbu-Soyosan extension of Line 1 opened and shuttle service from Yongsan station to Gwangmyeong station began (with the route now shortened from Yeongdeungpo to Gwangmyeong) on 15 December 2006. On 23 March 2007, AREX opened. The Deokso-Paldang extension of the Jungang Line opened on 27 December. On 15 December 2008, the Cheonan-Sinchang extension of Line 1 opened. The magnetic paper ticket changed to an RFID-based card on 1 May 2009. On 1 July the Gyeongui Line from Seoul Station to Munsan station opened, and on 24 July Line 9 from Gaehwa station to Sinnonhyeon station opened.

The Byeongjeom-Seodongtan extension of Line 1 opened on 26 February 2010, and the Gyeongchun Line opened on 21 December. On 28 October 2011, the Shinbundang Line from Gangnam station to Jeongja station opened. The Suin Line, from Oido station to Songdo station, opened on 30 June 2012. The U Line opened on 1 July, the Onsu-Bupyeong-gu Office extension of Line 7 on 27 October and the Gongdeok-Gajwa extension of the Gyeongui Line on 15 December, and on 26 April 2013, EverLine opened. On 27 December 2014, the Gyeongui Line was extended to Yongsan and started through running to the Jungang Line, forming the Gyeongui·Jungang Line. The Sinnonhyeon-Sports Complex extension of Line 9 opened on 28 March 2015. On 30 January 2016 the Jeongja-Gwanggyo extension of the Shinbundang Line opened, followed by the Songdo-Incheon extension of the Suin Line on 27 February. Incheon Subway Line 2 opened on 30 July, and the Gyeonggang Line on 24 September. The Gyeongui-Jungang Line is extended one station east to Jipyeong station on 21 January 2017, with 4 round trips to Jipyeong station. On 16 June 2018 the Seohae Line opened. Magongnaru station on Line 9 became an interchange station with AREX on 29 September 2018. Bundang line was extended northeastward to Cheongnyangni station, allowing for connections to the Gyeongchun Line and regional rail services on 31 December 2018. On 28 September 2019, the Gimpo Goldline opened. On 12 September 2020, the Suin Line extension between Hanyang Univ. at Ansan and Suwon, beginning the interlining with Line 4 between Oido and Hanyang Univ. at Ansan, as well as through-running with the Bundang Line to form the Suin–Bundang Line. On May 24, 2022, the Sillim Line opened, becoming the newest addition to the Seoul Metropolitan Subway.

Lines and branches
The system is organized such that numbered lines, with some exceptions, are considered as urban rapid transit lines located within the Seoul National Capital Area (SNCA), whereas wide-area commuter lines operated by Korail provide a metro-like commuter rail service that usually extends far beyond the boundaries of the SNCA, rather similar to the RER in Paris. The AREX is an airport rail link that links Incheon International Airport and Gimpo Airport to central Seoul, and offers both express service directly to Incheon International Airport and all-stop commuter service for people living along the vicinity of the line. While operating hours may vary depending on the line in question, the Seoul Metropolitan Subway generally operates from 5.30 a.m. until 1 a.m. on weekdays, and from 5.30 a.m. until midnight on weekends.

Rolling stock

Fares and ticketing

The Seoul Metropolitan Subway system operates on a unified transportation fare system, meaning that subways and buses in Seoul, Incheon and Gyeonggi-do are treated as one system when it comes to fares. For example, a subway rider can transfer to any other line for free (with the exception of Shinbundang Line, EverLine and U Line, the latter two adding a flat charge of 200 and 300 won respectively). One can also transfer to any Seoul, Incheon, Gyeonggi-do, or some Chungcheongnam-do city buses for free and get discounted fares on the more expensive express buses.

In the case of Shinbundang Line, charges vary depending on the section used. The Sinsa - Gangnam section always charges 500 won, while the Gangnam - Jeongja section or the Jeongja - Gwanggyo section charges 1000 won when used alone, and 1400 altogether when used in conjunction with another. In total, the maximum added fee one can be charged is 1900 won, which can be achieved by using all three sections.

Fare payments in Seoul are mainly handled by T-money and Cash Bee, which can also be used on buses, convenience stores and many other popular retail places. Riders must touch in a phone, card or other metro card and enabled device at the entry gates. Popular methods of payments are using NFC-enabled Android smartphones (topped up or billed to the owner's credit/debit card via the T-money app) or credit or check (debit) cards with built-in RFID technology issued by the bank or card company.

The current single-use ticket is a credit card-sized plastic card with RFID technology, which can be obtained from automated machines in every subway station. A 500 won deposit fee is included in the price, and is refunded when the ticket is returned at any station. Multiple use cards are sold in convenience stores and the functionality is included in many credit/debit cards.

Fares (except for single-use tickets) are currently 1,250 won for a trip up to 10 km (6.2 mi), with 100 won added for each subsequent 5 km (3.1 mi). Once 50 km (31.1 mi) has been passed, 100 won will be added every 8 km (5.0 mi). Single-use ticket users must pay RFID deposit 500 won plus 100 won surcharge to fare.

Half-priced children's tickets are available. The city government also uses Seoul Citypass as a transportation card. Senior citizens and disabled people qualify for free transit and can get a free ticket or enter and exit using side gates rather than turnstiles.

International travelers can also use a Metropolitan Pass (MPASS) which provides up to 20 trips per day during the prepaid duration of 1 day to 7 days. Depending on where you purchase the card, the service is limited to the Seoul metropolitan area or Jeju Island and does not work in taxis or certain convenience stores.

Current construction

Opening 2023
Line 1 will be extended north from Soyosan station to Yeoncheon station in May 2023, the existing line between Dongducheon and Soyosan is to be upgraded and double-tracked.
The Seohae Line will be extended north after March 2023 from Sosa station to Daegok station, with transfers to Line 3 and the Gyeongui-Jungang Line at Daegok. There will also be transfers to Line 5, 9, AREX, and the Gimpo Goldline at Gimpo International Airport station, as well as Line 7 at Bucheon Stadium station. Services will run up to Ilsan station, sharing trackage with Gyeongui–Jungang Line from Neunggok station to Ilsan Station. The line will also be extended in October 2023 from Wonsi to Seohwaseongnamyang.
Line 8 will be extended north from Amsa station to Byeollae station on the Gyeongchun Line in September 2023, with a transfer to the Gyeongui-Jungang Line at Guri station and also to ByeollaeByeolgaram Station in the future, with a transfer to Line 4.

GTX A will open between Dongtan station and Unjeong station. Great Train eXpress (also known as GTX) is a new type of separate express regional railway which will comprise a network of 3 lines to complement the existing subway network. The first phase of the GTX A Line will ultimately include 11 stations, over 83.3 km (51.77 mi).

Opening 2024
The Incheon Subway Line 1 will be extended north in December 2024 by 6.8 km (4.226 mi), from Gyeyang station to Geomdan station, with 3 new stations. Geomdan station is later expected to become a transfer station with the Gimpo Goldline and the Incheon Subway Line 2, for which extensions are in planning.
 The Wirye Line, another light metro line in southeastern Seoul, will open in 2024 between Macheon station on Line 5 and splitting into two branches: one at Bokjeong station on Line 8 and Bundang line, and one at Namwirye station, a station on Line 8, with 12 stations planned. While technically part of the subway system, the Wirye Line will actually be a tramway line.

Opening 2025 or later
The Dongbuk Line, a light metro line in northeastern Seoul, is scheduled to open in 2025 with 14 stations between Wangsimni station and Eunhaeng Sageori station.
The Gyeonggang Line will be extended to the west, from Pangyo station to Wolgot station by 2026. The extension will be 49.6 km long, and partly share tracks with the Sinansan Line. There will be 11 additional stations to the line, including transfers available at Wolgot station (Suin-Bundang Line), Siheung City Hall station (Seohae Line, Sinansan Line), Gwangmyeong Station (Line 1, Sinansan Line), Anyang station (Line 1), Indeogwon station (Line 4, Indeogwon-Dongtan Line). Service may then be further extended further west towards downtown Incheon using the tracks of the Suin-Bundang Line.
The Sinansan Line will open in 2025. The line will start at Yeouido station and split into two branches: one to Hanyang University ERICA Campus station, and one to Songsan station on the Seohae Line. The second branch will partly share tracks with the Seohae Line and the Gyeonggang Line.
Line 7 will be extended 3 stations northwards to Okjeong station in Yangju, with a transfer with Tapseok station on the U Line by 2025. It is also scheduled to extend from Seongnam station to Cheongna International City station in 2027, with a transfer with AREX.
Line 9 will be extended 4 stations eastwards from VHS Medical Center station to Saemteo Park station, with a transfer with Godeok station on Line 5 by 2028.
Hagik station, between Songdo station and Inha University station on the Suin–Bundang Line, will open as an in-fill station once redevelopment of the area surrounding it is completed. This area will feature cultural, commercial, and medical facilities along with new residential areas.

Approved for construction 
The following lines have not started construction, but are considered to be approved after their plans and their financing have been finalized. Most of these lines are scheduled to start construction in the next couple of years.

 The Wirye–Sinsa Line, a light metro line in southeastern Seoul, will open between Sinsa station and Wirye with 11 stations planned.
Line 7 will also be further extended 3 stations northwards from Okjeong station in Yangju, currently under construction, to the city of Pocheon, with a terminus at Pocheon station.
The Shinbundang Line will be extended north from Sinsa station to Yongsan station, with 3 new stations over 5.3 km. Construction will begin upon the completion of the transfer of ownership of the Yongsan Garrison to the Korean government. 
The Shinbundang Line will also be extended south from Gwanggyo Jungang station to Homaesil station, with 5 new stations and 11 km of tracks. Construction will begin in 2023.
 The Seobu Line is a new light metro line, which will have a length of 18 km and go through 16 stations, starting at Gwanaksan station, which is also the last station of the Sillim Line, and then go North-West across the Han River and up to Saejeol station on Line 6. Construction will begin in 2023.
 The Indeogwon-Dongtan Line is a new metro line in the south part of the Seoul Capital Area. It will have 17 stations and a length of 33.7 km, starting at Indeogwon station and terminating at Dongtan station. Construction is scheduled to start by the end of 2021.
GTX B and GTX C have been approved, and will offer new express commuter rail service to complement the existing subway service. GTX C should start construction in 2022, and will go from Suwon Station to Deokjeong Station. Construction of GTX B, which will go from Songdo station to Maseok station, should follow soon afterwards.

Planned

Seoul City 
The Seoul Metropolitan government published a ten-year plan for expansion of the subway with the following projects under consideration.

Gangbukhoengdan Line, a new line running in an arc north of Seoul between Cheongnyangni station and Mok-dong station with 19 stations planned. The line will provide transfers to Lines 1, 3, 4, 5, 6, 9, AREX, Gyeongui–Jungang, Gyeongchun, Bundang and Ui line.
Ui LRT will open a branch line from Solbat Park station to Banghak station on Line 1, the extension will open with 3 stations.
Myeonmok Line is a light metro in the northeastern area of Seoul running between Cheongnyangni station and Sinnae station with 12 stations and connections to the Gyeongchun Line and Line 6.
Nangok Line is a branch of the light metro Sillim Line in the southwestern area of Seoul running between Nangok-dong and Boramae Park with 5 stations planned.
Mok-dong Line is a light metro in southwestern Seoul running between Sinwol-dong and Dangsan station on line 2, with 12 stations planned.
Line 4 will start running express services between Danggogae station and Namtaeryeong station.
Line 5 will start running shuttle services connecting Gubeundari station on the mainline and Dunchon-dong station on the Macheon Branch.
The Sillim Line will be connected to Seobu Line with a track between Seoul National University station (Line 2) and Gwanaksan(Seoul National Univ.).

Incheon City 
The Incheon Metropolitan government is working on the Second Incheon Metro Network Construction Plan that inherits the Incheon Metro Network Construction Plan published in 2016. It includes the construction of five new tram lines. The draft is expected to be released in October 2020.

Incheon Subway line 3 is planned to be a semi-circular subway line of Incheon. It will intersect Seoul Line 1 at Dowon station and to Incheon Line 1 at Dongmak station.

Network map

See also

 Seoul Light Rapid Transit
 Incheon Subway
 Pyongyang Metro
 Seoul Metropolitan Subway stations
 Transport in South Korea
 List of metro systems
 List of tram and light rail transit systems
 Incheon Airport Maglev

Notes

References

External links

 Official websites by company
 Korail
 Seoul Metro
 Seoul Metropolitan Rapid Transit Corporation (Archeived)
 Shinbundang Line
 Cyber Station - Map, station and route finder
 Seoul city government
 The Seoul Underground Subway: Official Seoul Tourism
 English-language WMV video describing Seoul Subway history, current construction and future projects

 
Railway companies established in 1974
Underground rapid transit in South Korea